South America has historically seen a relatively modest demand for skyscrapers, with the majority of the continent's tallest buildings being residential. Office buildings have not historically been built taller than residential buildings in the region, though this scenario may well change in the next decades, as South America has been experiencing substantial economic growth.

Most of the continent's high-rises are in Argentina, Brazil, Chile, Colombia and Venezuela, with the tallest buildings being located in Buenos Aires, São Paulo, Balneário Camboríu, Santiago, Bogotá, Cartagena, and Caracas, all of which (except Balneário Camboríu) are one of the biggest financial centres of these countries.

History
The first skyscrapers of at least  height in South America were built in the 1920s, and included the Martinelli Building in São Paulo, Palacio Barolo in Buenos Aires, and the Palacio Salvo in Montevideo. Martinelli was not only the first, but the tallest skyscraper of South America until being surpassed by the Altino Arantes Building, also in São Paulo, in 1947.

Many of the tallest buildings in South America are located in central business districts that emerged as early as the 19th century, or in office parks developed during the second half of the 20th century. Some of the most notable include Catalinas Norte and Puerto Madero (Buenos Aires); along the Centro Empresarial Nações Unidas and the Central Zone of São Paulo (São Paulo); Sanhattan (Santiago); and Parque Central Complex (Caracas).

Tallest buildings

See also

 List of tallest buildings in Argentina
 List of tallest buildings in Bolivia
 List of tallest buildings in Brazil
 List of tallest buildings in Chile
 List of tallest buildings in Colombia
 List of tallest buildings in Ecuador
 List of tallest buildings in Paraguay
 List of tallest buildings in Peru
 List of tallest buildings in Uruguay
 List of tallest buildings in Venezuela
 List of tallest buildings in Latin America

References

External links 

 
Tallest buildings